Schonfeld is a surname that may refer to

Heinrich Schönfeld (born 1900), Austrian football player
Julie Schonfeld (born 1965), American female rabbi
Reese Schonfeld, Maurice "Reese" Schonfeld, American television journalist and co-founder of CNN and the Food Network
Solomon Schonfeld (1912-1984), British rabbi

See also
Schönfeld (disambiguation)
Sonnenfeld (disambiguation)
Schoenfeld (disambiguation)